Máine Mór mac Eochaidh (fl. 4th century) was the founder of the kingdom of Uí Maine.

Biography

Máine Mór descended from Colla da Chrioch of Oirghialla/Oriel, Máine Mór, his father Eochaidh Ferdaghiall and his two sons Breasal and Amhlaibh, travelled to Connacht to seek new lands. They attacked the lands of the local king, Cian d'Fhearaibh Bolg, king of the Fir Bolg (see Soghain and Senchineoil), amongst the other minor tribes and with the intervention of Grellan, settled in the land. In return, the Uí Maine would evermore pay tribute to Grellan, who became the dynasty's patron saint.

Maine Mór reigned for fifty years, and is the ancestor of the following families: Lally, Madden, Kelly, Fallon, Neachtain, Threinfhir, and others.

He was succeeded by his surviving son, Breasal mac Maine Mór, who ruled for thirty years.

Notable descendants

 Tadhg Mór Ua Cellaigh (d. 1014), the first O'Kelly
 Madudan Reamhar Ua Madadhan, Chief of Síol Anmchadha, 1069-1096
 Gillafin mac Coulahan lord of Síol Anmchadha, 1096-1101
 Seán Ó Maolalaidh (fl. 1419–1480), Chief of the Name
 Feardorcha Ó Cellaigh, 68th and last king of Uí Maine, 43rd Chief of the Name, fl. 1584-after 1611
 Samuel Madden (1686-1765), author
 Thomas Arthur, comte de Lally, baron de Tollendal (January 1702 – 1766), French general
 Thomas J. Kelly (Irish nationalist) (d. 1908), Irish revolutionary and USA soldier
 Arthur Colahan (died 1952), composer of the song "Galway Bay"
 Mian Kelly, model, 1898-1973
 Albert Naughton (fl. 1953), Great Britain rugby league player
 Robin C. N. Williamson (1942), English Professor of Surgery

See also
 Kings of Uí Maine, c.450-after 1611

References

 http://www.rootsweb.ancestry.com/~irlkik/ihm/uimaine.htm
 Annals of Ulster at CELT: Corpus of Electronic Texts at University College Cork
 Annals of Tigernach at CELT: Corpus of Electronic Texts at University College Cork
 Revised edition of McCarthy's synchronisms at Trinity College Dublin.
 Irish Kings and High-Kings, Francis John Byrne, Dublin (1971;2003) Four Courts Press, 
 History of the O'Maddens of Hy-Many, Gerard Madden, 2004. .
 The Life, Legends and Legacy of Saint Kerrill: A Fifth-Century East Galway Evangelist by Joseph Mannion, 2004. 
 http://www.ucc.ie/celt/published/G105007/index.html

People from County Galway
People from County Roscommon
Irish soldiers
4th-century Irish people
4th-century Irish monarchs
Kings of Uí Maine